The flag that served as the symbol of the Republic of Central Lithuania was established on 12 October 1920 and remained in use until 18 April 1922, when the state ceased to exist.

Design 
The flag was officially defined as a red flag with eagle and Pahonia (a knight on a horse) on it. It consists of 2 charges set next to each other in the middle. On the right is a silver (white) eagle, and on the left, a silver (white) Pahonia, a charge, that consists of a knight with a sword in his right hand, and a shield with the Cross of Lorraine in his left hand, that is sitting on a jumping horse.

History 
The flag was established as the symbol of the state, on 12 November 1920, in the Decree No. 1 of the Chief-in-command of the Army of Central Lithuania. It stopped being used after the Republic of Central Lithuania was incorporated into Poland on 18 April 1922.

See also 
 coat of arms of Central Lithuania

References 

Republic of Central Lithuania
Central Lithuania
Central Lithuania
Central Lithuania, Republic
Central Lithuania, Republic
Central Lithuania, Republic
Central Lithuania, Republic
Central Lithuania, Republic
Central Lithuania, Republic
1920 establishments in Poland
1920 establishments in Lithuania
1920 establishments in Belarus
1922 disestablishments in Poland
1922 disestablishments in Lithuania
1922 disestablishments in Belarus